Auer von Welsbach:
 Alois Auer, Ritter von Welsbach
 Carl Auer, Freiherr (Baron) von Welsbach, son of Alois

See also 
 Auer (surname)
 Auer (disambiguation)
 Welsbach

Compound surnames
Surnames of German origin